is a multidirectional scrolling shooter arcade game which was developed and released by Namco in Japan in 1981. In North America, it was manufactured and distributed by Midway Games. The goal of the game is to earn as many points as possible by destroying enemy missiles and bases using a ship which shoots from both the front and back. Bosconian became the first shoot 'em up game to feature diagonal movement.

Bosconian was commercially successful in Japan and received positive critical reception, but did not achieve the global commercial success of other shoot 'em up games from the golden age of arcade video games. The game was ported to home computers as Bosconian '87 in 1987, and spawned two sequels: Blast Off in 1989, and Final Blaster in 1990. The game has subsequently been regarded by critics as influential in the shoot 'em up genre.

Gameplay

The objective of Bosconian is to score as many points as possible by destroying enemy missiles and bases. The player controls the Starfighter, a ship that can move in eight directions and fires both forward and backward simultaneously. Throughout the game, the Starfighter stays affixed to the center of the screen as it moves. During each round, several green enemy bases — known as "base stars" — appear, all of which must be destroyed in order to advance to the next round. The number of bases increases with each round. Each base has six globe-like cannons arranged in a hexagon around a central core. To destroy a base, the player must either shoot the core or destroy all six cannons, the latter of which gives the player extra points. In later levels, cores begin defending themselves by opening and closing while launching missiles. A radar display on the right-hand side of the screen shows where enemies are located relative to the player. The game also features a color-coded alert system with voice commands.

Additionally, the player must avoid or destroy stationary asteroids, mines, and a variety of enemy missiles and ships which attempt to collide with his or her ship. Enemy bases will also occasionally launch a squadron of ships in formation attacks — destroying the leader causes all remaining enemies to disperse, but destroying all enemies in a formation scores extra bonus points. A spy ship will also appear occasionally, which must be destroyed or the game's alert system will turn to red regardless of how long the player has taken. Throughout the game, a digitized voice alerts the player to various events, such as incoming enemies or an approaching spy ship.

Plot
The game takes place after the fictional Rock War, an intergalactic conflict between mankind and aliens which ended with the aliens destroying Earth with missile-firing space stations, known as "Orbitals", and enslaving all humans. In an attempt to fight back against the aliens and regain their independence, humans built a spacecraft known as the Starfighter with the best technology they could find. However, only one such vehicle could be built. The game involves the unnamed pilot of the Starfighter defeating the aliens to save Earth.

Reception

In Japan, Bosconian was the seventh highest-grossing arcade game of 1981, according to the annual Game Machine chart. Game Machine later listed Bosconian in their August issue as the 22nd most successful table arcade cabinet of the month. However, the game was less successful internationally. Due to the rising popularity of Galaga and a shortage of arcade machines for the game, many of the Bosconian machines that were not selling were transformed into Galaga machines.

Upon release, Bosconian received generally positive reviews. Video Games Magazine referred to the game as a "treat for Galaxian fans" and opining that, while it did not "break ground insofar as graphics, sounds, weaponry, and antagonists are concerned," it had "a terrific eight-way joystick that has great maneuverability". Electronic Games called it "a real space-gamer's delight", highly praising its 360-degree movement and the ship's simultaneous front-rear fire, which they noted made it the first game to feature either element, as well as its graphics, gameplay, and other mechanics.

Mike Roberts and Steve Phipps of Computer Gamer reviewed the arcade game several years after its release in 1985, stating it was "good value" and still "enjoyable to play." In a retrospective 1998 review of the game, Brett Alan Weiss of Allgame wrote that the game's front-rear firing system, radar display, and alert system "help[ed] make the game a cut above the average shooter of the era".

In another retrospective review in 2018 of the Sharp X68000 version of the game, Akiba PC Hotline! praised the conversion's accurate portrayal of the arcade original and the "wonderful" rearranged soundtrack. Beep! criticized the Sord M5 version of the game for its poor quality, low difficulty level, and the lack of features from the arcade original, such as the voice samples.

Accolades
Bosconian won the 1983 Arcade Award for "Best Science Fiction/Fantasy Coin-Op Game", beating both Atari's Gravitar and Sega's Zaxxon.

In 1998, Japanese publication Gamest selected Bosconian as one of the best arcade games of the era, complementing its Rally-X-like radar system, atmosphere and addictive nature. They have cited it as being an influential shooter for its vast game world and setting, labeling it as "an excellent introductory game" for players new to the genre.

Sequels
Bosconian '87, a home computer port of Bosconian, was created by Binary Design and released for several systems, including the Amstrad CPC, ZX Spectrum and Commodore 64 in 1987. In 2003, PC Zone called Bosconian '87 a "spiffing little game", praising the game's soundtrack on the Spectrum 128. Sinclair Users Tamara Howard gave the port seven out of ten stars.

A sequel to Bosconian, Blast Off, was released in 1989 in Japan. A second sequel, Final Blaster, was released in 1990 for the PC Engine, also in Japan.

Legacy
Bosconian has been considered influential for other multidirectional shooters, and has been called "a granddaddy of the multidirectional shooter" by Retro Gamer. Bosconian served as the main inspiration for the 1983 arcade game Sinistar and as an inspiration for the 1982 arcade game Time Pilot.

Bosconian later appeared in several Namco Museum compilations for PlayStation and other consoles, including Namco Museum Vol. 1, Namco Museum 50th Anniversary, Namco Museum Virtual Arcade, and Namco Museum Megamix. The game has also been released as part of Jakks Pacific's TV game controllers.

Notes

References

External links

1981 video games
Arcade video games
MSX games
Midway video games
Namco arcade games
Bandai Namco Entertainment franchises
Multidirectional shooters
Sharp X1 games
X68000 games
Virtual Console games
Multiplayer and single-player video games
Video games developed in Japan
Video games scored by Yuzo Koshiro